Cataraqui may refer to:

 Cataraqui (ship), a ship which was wrecked near King Island, Tasmania, Australia, in 1845 with the loss of 406 lives
 , a 1942 Canadian merchant ship
 Fort Cataraqui, the former name of Fort Frontenac

In Kingston, Ontario, Canada
 The original townsite of Kingston, Ontario
Cataraqui River
Little Cataraqui Creek
Cataraqui Cemetery
Cataraqui  Centre, a large shopping mall
Cataraqui Clippers, a Canadian soccer team which became the Kingston Clippers